Spann Methodist Church and Cemetery is a historic Methodist church and cemetery located at 150 Church Street in Ward, Saluda County, South Carolina.  The church was established  and built in 1873. Unchanged since building, it is a one-story, frame meeting house form church with Greek Revival style elements. The front facade features an engaged tetrastyle portico with a pedimented gable roof.  The cemetery was established about 1842, and includes a significant collection of funerary art dating to the late-19th and early-20th centuries.

It was added to the National Register of Historic Places in 2003.

References

External links
 

Methodist churches in South Carolina
Churches on the National Register of Historic Places in South Carolina
Cemeteries on the National Register of Historic Places in South Carolina
Churches completed in 1873
19th-century Methodist church buildings in the United States
Buildings and structures in Saluda County, South Carolina
Methodist cemeteries
National Register of Historic Places in Saluda County, South Carolina